A mime artist, or simply mime (from Greek , , "imitator, actor"), is a person who uses mime (also called pantomime outside of Britain), the acting out of a story through body motions without the use of speech, as a theatrical medium or as a performance art. In earlier times, in English, such a performer would typically be referred to as a mummer. Miming is distinguished from silent comedy, in which the artist is a character in a film or skit without sound.

Jacques Copeau, strongly influenced by Commedia dell'arte and Japanese Noh theatre, used masks in the training of his actors. His pupil Étienne Decroux was highly influenced by this, started exploring and developing the possibilities of mime, and developed corporeal mime into a highly sculptural form, taking it outside the realms of naturalism. Jacques Lecoq contributed significantly to the development of mime and physical theatre with his training methods. As a result of this, the practice of mime has been included in the Inventory of the Intangible Cultural Heritage in France since 2017.

History

Ancient Greece and Rome

The performance of mime originates at its earliest in Ancient Greece; the name is taken from a single masked dancer called Pantomimus, although performances were not necessarily silent. The first recorded mime was Telestēs in the play Seven Against Thebes by Aeschylus. Tragic mime was developed by Puladēs of Kilikia; comic mime was developed by Bathullos of Alexandria. Mime was an aspect of Roman theatre from its earliest times, paralleling the Atellan farce in its improvisation (if without the latter's stock characters). It gradually began to replace the Atellanae as interludes [embolium] or postscripts [exodium] on the main theatre stages; became the sole dramatic event at the Floralia in the second century BC; and in the following century received technical advances at the hands of Publius Syrus and Decimus Laberius. Under the Empire mime became the predominant Roman drama, if with mixed fortunes under different emperors. Trajan banished mime artists; Caligula favored them; Marcus Aurelius made them priests of Apollo. Nero himself acted as a mime. The mime was distinguished from other dramas by its absence of masks, and by the presence of female as well as male performers. Stock characters included the lead (or ), the stooge or stupidus, and the gigolo, or cultus adulter.

Medieval Europe 
In Medieval Europe, early forms of mime such as mummer plays and later dumbshows evolved. In early nineteenth-century Paris, Jean-Gaspard Deburau solidified the many attributes that have come to be known in modern times—the silent figure in whiteface.

In non-Western theatre 
Analogous performances are evident in the theatrical traditions of other civilizations. Classical Indian musical theatre, although often erroneously labeled a "dance," is a group of theatrical forms in which the performer presents a narrative via stylized gesture, an array of hand positions, and mime illusions to play different characters, actions, and landscapes. Recitation, music, and even percussive footwork sometimes accompany the performance. The Natya Shastra, an ancient treatise on theatre by Bharata Muni, mentions silent performance, or mukabhinaya. In Kathakali, stories from Indian epics are told with facial expressions, hand signals and body motions. Performances are accompanied by songs narrating the story while the actors act out the scene, followed by actor detailing without background support of narrative song. The Japanese Noh tradition has greatly influenced many contemporary mime and theatre practitioners including Jacques Copeau and Jacques Lecoq because of its use of mask work and highly physical performance style. Butoh, though often referred to as a dance form, has been adopted by various theatre practitioners as well.

Formats

In film 

Before the work of Étienne Decroux there was no major treatise on the art of mime, and so any recreation of mime as performed prior to the twentieth century is largely conjecture, based on interpretation of diverse sources. However, the twentieth century also brought a new medium into widespread usage: the motion picture. The restrictions of early motion picture technology meant that stories had to be told with minimal dialogue, which was largely restricted to intertitles. This often demanded a highly stylized form of physical acting largely derived from the stage. Thus, mime played an important role in films prior to advent of talkies (films with sound or speech). The mimetic style of film acting was used to great effect in German Expressionist film. Silent film comedians like Charlie Chaplin, Harold Lloyd, and Buster Keaton learned the craft of mime in the theatre, but, through film, they had a profound influence on mimes working in live theatre decades after their deaths. Indeed, Chaplin may be the best-documented mime in history. Harpo Marx, of the Marx Brothers comedy team, continued the mime tradition in the sound film era, his silent persona working in counterpoint to the verbal comedy of his brothers Groucho and Chico. The famous French comedian, writer, and director Jacques Tati achieved his initial popularity working as a mime, and his later films had only minimal dialogue, relying instead on many subtle expertly choreographed visual gags. Tati, like Chaplin before him, would mime out the movements of every single character in his films and ask his actors to repeat them.

On stage and street

Mime has been performed on stage, with Marcel Marceau and his character "Bip" being the most famous. Mime is also a popular art form in street theatre and busking. Traditionally, these sorts of performances involve the actor/actress wearing tight black and white clothing with white facial makeup. However, contemporary mimes often perform without whiteface. Similarly, while traditional mimes have been completely silent, contemporary mimes, while refraining from speaking, sometimes employ vocal sounds when they perform. Mime acts are often comical, but some can be very serious.

In literature 
Canadian author Michael Jacot's first novel, The Last Butterfly, tells the story of a mime artist in Nazi-occupied Europe who is forced by his oppressors to perform for a team of Red Cross observers. Nobel laureate Heinrich Böll's The Clown relates the downfall of a mime artist, Hans Schneir, who has descended into poverty and drunkenness after being abandoned by his beloved.

List of mime artists

 Samuel Avital
 Steven Banks
 Jean-Louis Barrault
 Blue Man Group
 Wolfe Bowart
 Tony Brown
 Charlie Chaplin
 Michel Courtemanche
 Adam Darius
 Jean-Gaspard Debureau
 Étienne Decroux
 Ryan Drummond
 Jogesh Dutta
 Ladislav Fialka
 Dario Fo
 George L. Fox
 Chris Harris
 Bill Irwin
 Alejandro Jodorowsky
 Doug Jones
 Buster Keaton
 Lindsay Kemp
 Stan Laurel
 Thomas Leabhart
 Grigory Gurevich 
 Jacques Lecoq
 Paul Legrand
 Tina Lenert
 Partha Pratim Majumder
 Marcel Marceau
 Ennio Marchetto
 Kari Margolis
 Carlos Martínez
 Harpo Marx
 Irene Mawer
 Samy Molcho
 Tony Montanaro
 Mummenschanz
 Stefan Niedziałkowski
 Adrian Pecknold
 Lenka Pichlíková-Burke
 Slava Polunin
 Oleg Popov
 Nola Rae
 Bari Rolfe
 Gene Sheldon
 Richmond Shepard
 Shields and Yarnell
 Red Skelton
 Steam Powered Giraffe
 Daniel Stein
 Marko Stojanović
 Jacques Tati
 Pan Tau
 Modris Tenisons
 Tik and Tok
 Henryk Tomaszewski
 Dick Van Dyke
 Sam Wills
 Vahram Zaryan
 Achille Zavatta

See also

Busking
Corporeal mime
Dumbshow
Lip sync
Liquid and digits
Sociae Mimae
Mummers play
Pantomime
Popping
Physical theatre
Turfing

References

Further reading

External links

World Mime Index
International mime theatre information 
MOVEO, international school of corporeal mime and physical theatre in Barcelona
International Theatre School Jacques Lecoq 
London International School of Performing Arts
Innovo Conservatory of Physical Theatre

Mime
Pantomime
Theatrical genres
Theatrical occupations
Silence
Theatre in France